Glenea suensoni is a species of beetle in the family Cerambycidae. It was described by Leopold Heyrovský in 1939.

References

suensoni
Beetles described in 1939